Jo Byeong-on (born 14 June 1961) is a South Korean wrestler. He competed in the men's freestyle 100 kg at the 1988 Summer Olympics.

References

External links
 

1961 births
Living people
South Korean male sport wrestlers
Olympic wrestlers of South Korea
Wrestlers at the 1988 Summer Olympics
Place of birth missing (living people)
Asian Games medalists in wrestling
Wrestlers at the 1990 Asian Games
Asian Games bronze medalists for South Korea
Medalists at the 1990 Asian Games
20th-century South Korean people
21st-century South Korean people